The cue sports was one of the many sports which was held at the 2002 Asian Games in Busan, South Korea between 1 and 8 October 2002. The competition took place at Dongju College Gymnasium. The competition included only men's events.

There were ten events at the competition, Carom billiards, English billiards, Pool and Snooker.

Schedule

Medalists

Medal table

Participating nations
A total of 132 athletes from 21 nations competed in cue sports at the 2002 Asian Games:

References 

2002 Asian Games Official Report, Pages 284–293
Global Snooker Centre

External links 
Official Website

 
2002 Asian Games events
2002
Asian Games
2002 Asian Games
2002 in snooker